Rejanellus is a genus of spiders in the family Thomisidae. It was first described in 2005 by Lise. , it contains 4 species.

References

Thomisidae
Araneomorphae genera
Spiders of the Caribbean